Seekonk High School is a public high school operated by Seekonk Public Schools in Seekonk, Massachusetts, United States. It serves the district's 9–12 student population. The school's mission statement is "All students will achieve their maximum potential by becoming responsible, productive citizens and life-long learners."

History

The class of 1967 was the first to graduate from Seekonk High (June, 1967). Seekonk students prior to this attended high school at nearby East Providence High School in East Providence, Rhode Island or Tolman High School in Pawtucket, Rhode Island depending on the area of town they resided in or private high schools.  When East Providence High School was unable to continue accepting Seekonk students the class of 1966 students from the south end of town attended Dighton-Rehoboth High School.  The newly constructed Seekonk High School was finished in time for class of 1967 to return for their Junior year (1965–66).  Some of the students chose to remain at Dighton-Rehoboth or other schools. In 2001, the school was renovated and a larger pool was added.

Athletics

Seekonk High School competes in the South Coast Conference (SCC). Divisions in sports range from D2-D4 depending on the sport. The mascot is the Warrior. Seekonk is usually a top contender in their conference in almost all sports offered.

Fall Sports:
 Boys golf
 Boys soccer
 Football
 Girls cross-country
 Boys cross-country
 Volleyball
 Cheerleading
 Field hockey
 Girls soccer
Winter Sports:
 Boys basketball 
 Girls basketball
 Girls indoor track
 Boys indoor track
 Boys swimming
 Girls swimming
 Gymnastics (Case/Seekonk) 
 Ice hockey (D.R./Seekonk)
Spring Sports:
 Baseball
 Softball
 Boys and girls outdoor track
 Boys tennis
 Girls tennis
 Boys Lacrosse
 Girls Lacrosse

The football team was noted for an undefeated regular season in 20072008. A highlight of the sports season is the annual Thanksgiving "Turkey Day" game against their rivals from neighboring Dighton-Rehoboth (Dighton, MA).

The baseball field is split between two states.  Most of the field is in Seekonk, Massachusetts, but a small portion including third base is located in East Providence, Rhode Island.

Band program
The Seekonk High School band program, under longtime director John Smialek, has received multiple awards and honors. As of 2016, the band has received nine Platinum awards in ten years at the annual Great East Festival in Westfield, Massachusetts; this is the highest honor awarded at the festival. In 2011, the band earned the Overall Grand Championship Award for wind ensembles at the 2010-11 Cruise Festivals; this represents the highest score overall from all Cruise Festival events on Royal Caribbean and Carnival cruises during 2010-11.

Notable alumni
Jon Blais, also known as Blazeman, was an American triathlete noted for his fight against amyotrophic lateral sclerosis (ALS) and is the namesake of the Blazeman Foundation.
 Jeff Chaukoian, four-time All-American track and field athlete at the University of Kentucky and assistant coach at University of Central Florida
John Gregorek Jr., middle distance runner
Cristina Nardozzi, Miss Massachusetts USA 2005
 Latroya Pina, swimmer who was selected to represent Cape Verde at the 2018 African Swimming Championships, the 2019 World Aquatics Championships, and the 2020 Summer Olympics
Ken Ryan, former Major League Baseball pitcher
Andrew Skurka, professional backpacker and National Geographic "Adventurer of the Year" 2007
Jason Swepson, American college football coach (Elon University, N.C. State, Boston College) and former player at Boston College

See also
Seekonk Public Schools

References

External links
 Seekonk High School

Seekonk, Massachusetts
Schools in Bristol County, Massachusetts
Public high schools in Massachusetts
1967 establishments in Massachusetts